Charles Ian Fisher (born October 4, 1965) is an American journalist who is a writer for Bloomberg. He was previously Jerusalem bureau chief at The New York Times. 

He has served a number of roles from deputy executive editor in charge to digital operations in the newsroom, to investigative editor to weekend editor. From 2008 to 2011, he was deputy foreign editor. He served two years as day editor for The Times home page, and 2013 was named assistant managing editor in charge of newsroom digital operations.

Fisher graduated from Boston University in 1987 and began his newspaper career at The Sun in Lowell, Massachusetts. In 1990, he joined The New York Times as a clerk and was promoted to reporter in 1992.

From 1998 to 2001, Fisher was The New York Times East Africa bureau chief (based in Nairobi, Kenya). He was bureau chief for Eastern Europe and the Balkans from 2001 to 2004. From 2004 to 2008, he was the paper's bureau chief in Rome. He covered various conflicts, including Iraq and the second intifada in Israel. He began in Jerusalem full-time in January 2017 and left the paper later that year.

Personal life
Fisher is married to Selma Kalousek, a photography editor.

Bibliography

As Contributor
 Hicks, Tyler. Histories Are Mirrors: The Path of Conflict through Iraq and Afghanistan. New York: Umbrage Editions, 2004.

Notes

External links
 Times Topics: Ian Fisher: list of his New York Times articles

1965 births
American male journalists
Boston University alumni
Living people
The New York Times editors
The New York Times writers
Place of birth missing (living people)
20th-century American journalists